Sir Rowland St John KB (1588 – 5 August 1645) was an English politician who sat in the House of Commons in 1614 and 1625.

St John was a younger son of Oliver St John, 3rd Baron St John of Bletso and his wife Dorothy Reid, daughter of Sir John Rede or Reid, of Odington, Gloucestershire. He matriculated as a fellow commoner at Queens' College, Cambridge in Easter 1604, and was probably the Rowland St John who received an MA from St John's College, Cambridge in 1614. 

In 1614, St John was elected Member of Parliament for Higham Ferrers. He purchased the manor of Woodford, Northamptonshire  from Simon Mallory in 1621. In 1625 he was elected MP for Tiverton. He was invested a Knight of the Bath in 1616.

St John married Sybilla Vaughan, daughter of John Vaughan of Hargast, Herefordshire. His son Oliver was created a baronet on 28 June 1660.

His five brothers, Oliver, Anthony, Alexander, Beauchamp and Henry all became MPs.

References

1588 births
1645 deaths
People from Higham Ferrers
Alumni of Queens' College, Cambridge
English MPs 1614
English MPs 1625
Younger sons of barons
Knights of the Bath